Pål Strand (born 9 March 1976 in Gjøvik) is a retired Norwegian football midfielder. Before transferring to Ham-Kam in 2008, he played for Lillestrøm for ten seasons. Previously he played for Gjøvik-Lyn and Raufoss. He has been capped 2 times for the Norwegian national team, coming on as a last-minute substitute each time.

References

External links

1976 births
Living people
Sportspeople from Gjøvik
Norwegian footballers
Raufoss IL players
Lillestrøm SK players
Hamarkameratene players
Norway international footballers

Association football midfielders
SK Gjøvik-Lyn players